The Emblem of West Bengal is the official seal of the government of the state of West Bengal, India.

Design
The emblem consists of a circle depicting a globe with the state of West Bengal highlighted by a representation of the Bengali alphabet. The National Emblem of India appears above the globe and the emblem includes the name of the state in the English i.e. West Bengal and Bengali language i.e.  . The central element of the emblem was also used by the Biswa Bangla campaign to promote sale of traditional West Bengali handicrafts and textiles.

History
The current emblem was designed by Mamata Banerjee, the Chief Minister of the state and was officially adopted in January 2018. Prior to the adoption of the new emblem in 2018, the state government used the National Emblem of India for official purposes but had adopted a distinctive logo for marketing purposes. This logo, known as "Banglarmukh" (Face of Bengal),  depicted a female face surround by a red veil.

Autonomous district councils in West Bengal 

West Bengal has one autonomous district council, the Gorkhaland Territorial Administration, which adopted its own emblem in October 2014. The emblem is a circular seal featuring a locomotive of the Darjeeling Himalayan Railway, a woman picking tea leaves, a rhododendron flower and mountain peaks of the Himalayas surrounded by the name of the authority and two pairs of crossed Kukri daggers.

Government banner
The Government of West Bengal can be represented by a banner displaying the emblem of the state on a white field.

See also
 State Emblem of India
 List of Indian state emblems

References

External links
 Government of West Bengal

Government of West Bengal
West Bengal
Symbols of West Bengal